Leiocephalus jamaicensis, commonly known as the Jamaican curlytail, was a species of lizard in the family Leiocephalidae (curly-tailed lizard). It was native to Jamaica.

References

Leiocephalus
Reptiles described in 1966
Reptiles of Jamaica
Taxa named by Richard Emmett Etheridge